"Wanted – A Good Home" is the fifth episode of the fifth and final series of the period drama Upstairs, Downstairs. It first aired on 5 October 1975 on ITV.

Background
"Wanted - A Good Home" was recorded in the studio on 6 and 7 March 1975, with the location footage having been filmed on 26 February in Eaton Place in Belgravia. John Hawkesworth, who wrote this episode, based some of the events seen in "Wanted - a Good Home" on his own childhood, Hawkesworth having had a governess himself.

Cast
Angela Baddeley - Mrs Bridges
Gordon Jackson - Hudson 
Jean Marsh - Rose
Hannah Gordon - Virginia Bellamy
David Langton - Richard Bellamy
Shirley Cain - Miss Treadwell
Jenny Tomasin - Ruby 
Peter Forest - Bert
Jacqueline Tong - Daisy
Gareth Hunt - Frederick
Anne Yarker - Alice Hamilton
Jonathan Seely - William Hamilton
Tracey Childs - Jennifer Chivers
Danvers - Thimble

Plot
It is spring 1922 and William, who is now eight years old, is off to a boarding preparatory school. After asking Virginia, Rose buys Alice a small dog, called "Thimble", for Alice to keep her company after William leaves.

Shortly William leaves, Richard and Virginia go to France. Miss Treadwell, the governess, believes she is in charge in their absence, and annoys the other servants by taking tea in the Morning Room. The servants are dismayed when she puts Alice on a bread and water diet as a punishment for her behaviour. Jennifer Chivers, a friend, joins Alice for her lessons with Miss Treadwell. When Thimble chews Miss Treadwell's shoe, she orders the dog to be presented to her the following morning so she can have it put down. However, the servants hide Thimble in Edward and Daisy's flat above the garage, and tells Miss Treadwell and Alice that it has gone "missing". It reappears moments after Richard and Virginia return home.

When Richard and Virginia return home, she immediately complains about the behaviour of the other servants. However, immediately Virginia dismisses Miss Treadwell and gives her four weeks wages instead of notice. It is then decided that Alice will go to a day school, something that Alice is very happy about.

Footnotes

References
Richard Marson, "Inside UpDown - The Story of Upstairs, Downstairs", Kaleidoscope Publishing, 2005
Updown.org.uk - Upstairs, Downstairs Fansite

Upstairs, Downstairs (series 5) episodes
1975 British television episodes
Fiction set in 1922